Henry Geiger (August 10, 1908 – 15 February 1989) was the editor, publisher, and chief writer of MANAS Journal which was published from 1948-1988.

He “had been variously a chorus boy on Broadway, a journalist, a conscientious objector in World War II, a commercial printer, and a lecturer at The United Lodge of Theosophists in Los Angeles.” Abraham Maslow called him “the only small ‘p’ philosopher America has produced in this century.” Geiger was also an advocate of Edward Bellamy's type of 
socialism. Some of Geiger's associates, such as Lewis Hill, would 
later be involved in the creation of Pacifica Radio.

References

External links
 MANAS Journal

American socialists
American magazine editors
1989 deaths
1908 births
20th-century American writers